Runge is a surname. Notable people with the surname include:

Aino Runge (1926–2014), Estonian financial economist, consumer defender and politician
August H. Runge (1852–1921), American Fire Marshal
Brian Runge (born 1970), American baseball umpire
Carl Runge (1856–1927), German physicist and mathematician
Runge–Kutta methods for numerical analysis
Runge's phenomenon, a problem in the field of numerical analysis
Runge's theorem
Laplace–Runge–Lenz vector
Carlisle Runge (1920–1983), American lawyer and diplomat
Cierra Runge (born 1996), American swimmer
Friedlieb Ferdinand Runge (1795–1867), German chemist
Iris Runge (1888-1966), German applied mathematician and physicist
Kurt Runge (1887–1959), German rower
Mary Munson Runge (1928–2014), American pharmacist
Norah Cecil Runge (1884–1978), British politician
Philipp Otto Runge (1777–1810), German painter
Wilhelm Runge (1895-1987), German electrical engineer and physicist

German-language surnames